Metropole is the sixth studio album from the punk band The Lawrence Arms. The record was released by Epitaph Records on January 28, 2014. Also released on the same date, as part of limited edition pre-order bundles, was the 7" vinyl-exclusive EP News From Yalta, which features three tracks from the same recording sessions that did not end up making it into the main release of Metropole. However, the digital Deluxe Edition (available on iTunes, Amazon, and so on) does include these 3 tracks in Metropole itself, numbering them tracks 13–15.

The album's lead single, "You Are Here", was released on November 18, 2013. A music video for Seventeener (17th and 37th) premiered on January 4, 2014.

Lawrence Arms bassist Brendan Kelly said in an interview with Noisey that during a trip to Italy he stayed at Hotel Metropole, which inspired the name of the album. He said many of the sound bites between the songs were recorded using his iPhone while he was in Italy. The clips themselves showcase various types of street musicians and other urban sounds to convey the album's theme of life in a city.

Track listing

Personnel
Chris McCaughan – guitar, vocals
Brendan Kelly – bass, vocals
Neil Hennessy – drums

References

2014 albums
The Lawrence Arms albums
Epitaph Records albums
Albums produced by Matt Allison (record producer)